Serge Véber (1897–1976) was a French screenwriter and film director. He also worked as a lyricist for operettas and was involved with many hit songs.

Selected filmography
 A Son from America (1932)
 King of the Hotel (1932)
 Sailor's Song (1932)
 King of the Ritz (1933)
 A Day Will Come (1934)
 My Heart Is Calling You (1934)
 La Route impériale (1935)
 The Romantic Age (1949)
 Brilliant Waltz (1949)
 A Hundred Francs a Second (1953)
 Madelon (1955)
 Mademoiselle and Her Gang (1957)
 The Lord's Vineyard (1958)

References

Bibliography
 Michelangelo Capua. Anatole Litvak: The Life and Films. McFarland, 2015.

External links

1897 births
1976 deaths
20th-century French screenwriters
Film directors from Paris